Demirören News Agency (DHA) is a Turkish news agency which was founded in 1999. It is owned by the Demirören Group. It provides news in English, German and Chinese as well as Turkish. In 2011 it had 41 offices in Turkey and 26 abroad.

Formerly owned by the Doğan Media Group and called Doğan Haber Ajansı, DHA was known for its critical coverage of the Turkish president Recep Tayyip Erdoğan. In March 2018, the parent company was sold to Demirören Group whose owner, Erdogan Demirören, is close to the Erdoğan government.

See also
Death of Alan Kurdi

References

External links 
 Official Website    

News agencies based in Turkey
Mass media companies established in 1999
Turkish companies established in 1999